Moslavina is a microregion in Croatia, administratively divided into the counties of Zagreb, Sisak-Moslavina and Bjelovar-Bilogora. The main city in the region in terms of traffic, commerce and business is the city of Kutina (central Moslavina), with 24,000 citizens.  Other important centres are Ivanić-Grad (western Moslavina), Čazma, Garešnica and Popovača. Moslavina borders the Zagreb region on the west and the Slavonia region on the east.

The region has a significant amount of natural resources. It also home to part of the nature park Lonjsko Polje, a wetland which is currently under consideration to become a UNESCO World Heritage site. The region is home of the companies Petrokemija and Selk, and over 6,000 people in the area are employed in the electronics industry.

See also
 Geography of Croatia

Sources
 Moslavina at enciklopedija.hr

External links
Lonjsko Polje Nature Park - UNESCO World Heritage Centre

Regions of Croatia